The 2015 Autumn Classic International was a senior international figure skating competition in the 2015–16 season. The second edition of the annual event was held on 12–15 October 2015 in Barrie, Canada. Medals were awarded in the disciplines of men's singles, ladies' singles, pair skating, and ice dancing on the senior level, and in those of singles on the junior level.

Results

Men

Ladies

Pairs

Ice dance

Junior men

Junior ladies

References

External links
 2015 Autumn Classic International at Skate Canada
 Full schedule at Skate Canada

Autumn Classic International, 2015
Autumn Classic International
Sport in Barrie